Saint-Lucien is a municipality in the Drummond Regional County Municipality in the Centre-du-Quebec region of Quebec. The population as of the Canada 2011 Census was 1,584.

On June 30, 2012, it changed its status from parish municipality to municipality.

Demographics

Population
Population trend:

Language
Mother tongue language (2006)

See also
 List of municipalities in Quebec

References

Municipalities in Quebec
Incorporated places in Centre-du-Québec